The 2016 Pajot Hills Classic was the first edition of the Pajot Hills Classic, a women's bicycle race in Belgium. It was held on 30 March 2016 over a distance of  starting and finishing in Gooik. It was rated by the UCI as a 1.2 category race.

Race
In the first part of the race the American Alison Tetrick (Cylance) went solo in the breakaway. She was caught and between the Muur van Geraardsbergen and the Bosberg the peloton split in several parts with a front group of about forty riders. With less than 20 km to go the Polish Katarzyna Niewiadoma (Rabo Liv) escaped and a bit later Ellen van Dijk (Boels–Dolmans), Anna van der Breggen (Rabo Liv), Megan Guarnier (Boels–Dolmans) and Elisa Longo Borghini (Wiggle High5) joined her. They got a gap but on the last cobble stones section, with about 5 km to go the group was caught.  In a sprint uphill Vos was the fastest ahead of Guarnier and the Finnish champion Lotta Lepisto (Cervelo Bigla).

Result

Source

See also
 2016 in women's road cycling

References

Pajot Hills Classic
Pajot Hills Classic
Cycle races in Belgium
Women's road bicycle races